Eileen Floanna Maria Cikamatana (born 18 September 1999) is an Australian weightlifter who previously represented Fiji. She competed in the women's 90 kg event at the 2018 Commonwealth Games, winning the gold medal. Cikamatana was named 2017 Fiji's sportswoman of the year, but was controversially omitted from consideration for the 2018 Fiji sports awards following her gold medal winning performance at the 2018 Commonwealth Games. She also won the gold medal in the women's 87 kg event at the 2022 Commonwealth Games held in Birmingham, England, which made her the first woman to win a gold medal at the Commonwealth Games for two different countries.

In the wake of a dispute between Weightlifting Fiji and breakaway group Fiji Weightlifters Association, she committed to representing Australia in February 2019 and was able to return to international competition later that year. However, the circumstances over her transfer of allegiance made Cikamatana ineligible to qualify for the delayed 2020 Summer Olympics in Tokyo.

Major results

References

External links

1999 births
Living people
Australian female weightlifters
Fijian female weightlifters
Fijian emigrants to Australia
Place of birth missing (living people)
Weightlifters at the 2018 Commonwealth Games
Weightlifters at the 2022 Commonwealth Games
Commonwealth Games gold medallists for Fiji
Commonwealth Games gold medallists for Australia
Commonwealth Games medallists in weightlifting
21st-century Australian women
21st-century Fijian women
Medallists at the 2018 Commonwealth Games
Medallists at the 2022 Commonwealth Games